Cnemaspis tapanuli is a species of gecko endemic to northern Sumatra in Indonesia.

References

Cnemaspis
Reptiles of Indonesia
Reptiles described in 2017